Liudmyla Grigorivna Barbir (born 30 November 1982) is a Ukrainian actress and TV presenter, cohosting the morning show Breakfast with 1 + 1 on the channel 1+1.

Biography 
Barbir was born on 30 November 1982 in the village of Chornohuzy, Vyzhnytsia Raion, Chernivtsi Oblast.

In 2004 she graduated from Kiev National I. K. Karpenko-Kary Theatre, Cinema and Television University with a degree in theater and film. She worked in the theaters "Ramp", "Bravo", "Theater perevtlennya" and others.

In 2007 she began to appear in commercials. In total, she has more than 20 works in this genre.

In 2011–2012, she was a host on the TV channel TET, the show Theory of Treason with Andrey Merzlikin.

Since 19 August 2013, she is paired with Ruslan Senichkin who has been conducting the morning show Breakfast with 1+1 on 1+1.

Barbir took part in the dubbing of feature films and TV shows, including Avatar, The Wolverine and Our Matter in Warsaw.

Personal life 
Barbir is married. Her husband is an aikido trainer. In 2012, she gave birth to a son, Taras.

References

1982 births
Living people
Ukrainian film actresses
Ukrainian television presenters
Ukrainian women television presenters
People from Chernivtsi Oblast
1+1 (TV channel) people